

 is a retired Japanese boxer who is the former WBC super bantamweight world champion.

Hatanaka began karate at the first grade of elementary school, and won the Japanese championship in the juvenile division at its sixth grade and the first grade of junior high school. In addition, he began football at the fourth grade of elementary school, and was scouted by a prestigious high school. He also set an interval record in the local ekiden race at the age of a junior high school student. At that time, informed from an acquaintance that a professional boxer got paid 30,000 yen per match in the amount of time, he became interested in boxing and joined Matsuda Boxing Gym. He compiled an amateur record of 28-0(21 KOs) before turning professional.
 
Hatanaka made his professional debut with a first-round knockout victory in November 1984, at the age of a high school student.　He won the annual Japanese boxing series, All-Japan Rookie King Tournament in the super flyweight division in March 1986. He captured the Japanese super flyweight title at the Korakuen Hall in February 1987.

In his first world title shot against WBC super flyweight champion Gilberto Román in September 1988, Hatanaka entered the ring of the Nagoya Rainbow Hall with full smile. Hatanaka floored Romàn in the first round, but was docked a point for a low blow late in the same round. Though Romàn was given a full five minutes to recover, he was hit below the belt again in the third round and took three minutes' rest. Hatanaka lost in the end via unanimous decision. Hatanaka was so nervous that he remembered almost nothing after the fight.

 
Hatanaka then fought against Pedro Rubén Décima for the WBA super Flyweight title at the Nagoya International Exhibition Hall, aka Port Messe Nagoya, on February 3, 1991. Hatanka floored Pedro in the first round, but felt calm enough to  pummel Pedro round by round. After knocking down Décima four times in the fourth round, he sent him to the canvas two more times in the seventh and eighth rounds before the referee stopped the bout.

In his first defense against Daniel Zaragoza on June 14 of that year, Zaragoza was cut on the corner of his left eye from an accidental head butt in the fourth round, and the referee took a point away from Zaragoza. From the seventh or eighth round, Zaragoza had triple vision in his right eye, and the blood flowed into his left eye. Hatanaka lost his title via a split decision in front of 9,000 spectators at the Nagoya Rainbow Hall. In 2007, Alvaro Morales of ESPN Deportes wrote it as many Asians' consideration, "the best fight of the decade". Although Hatanaka desired a rematch, he suffered from ophthalmoplegia caused by this fight, and retired as a boxer after four months. 
  
Currently he is the president of Hatanaka Boxing Gym in Nagoya. Hatanaka Promotions has provided a boxing television program Soul Fighting on Chubu-Nippon Broadcasting. Toshihide Tsutsumi who was presented with the tenth Eddie Townsend Award in 1999, serves as a trainer at that gym.

See also
List of WBC world champions
List of super-bantamweight boxing champions
List of Japanese boxing world champions
Boxing in Japan

References

Bibliography

External links

World Boxing Council champions
World super-bantamweight boxing champions
World boxing champions
Sportspeople from Aichi Prefecture
1967 births
Living people
Japanese male boxers